Aristidis Magafinis (born 4 September 1973) is a retired Greek football striker from Prinos, Thassos.

References

1973 births
Living people
Greek footballers
Kavala F.C. players
A.P.O. Akratitos Ano Liosia players
Olympiakos Nicosia players
PAS Lamia 1964 players
Doxa Drama F.C. players
Leonidio F.C. players
Super League Greece players
Association football forwards
Greek expatriate footballers
Expatriate footballers in Cyprus
Greek expatriate sportspeople in Cyprus
People from Thasos
Footballers from Eastern Macedonia and Thrace